Cionopsis is a genus of true weevils in the beetle family Curculionidae. There are about five described species in Cionopsis.

Species
These five species belong to the genus Cionopsis:
 Cionopsis crispula Burke, 1981 c
 Cionopsis echinata Burke, 1981 c
 Cionopsis lineola Burke, 1982 i c b
 Cionopsis maculata Burke, 1982 i c b
 Cionopsis palliatus Champion, G.C., 1903 c
Data sources: i = ITIS, c = Catalogue of Life, g = GBIF, b = Bugguide.net

References

Further reading

External links

Curculioninae
Articles created by Qbugbot